Zsuzsi Gartner is a Canadian author and journalist.

Biography
Gartner was born in Winnipeg and moved to Calgary in early childhood. She earned a BA in political science at the University of Calgary, later receiving an honours degree in journalism from Carleton University in Ottawa and an MFA from the University of British Columbia in Vancouver, where she currently resides.

Gartner started her career as a newspaper and magazine journalist for a number of publications, including the Vancouver Sun, The Globe and Mail, Saturday Night, Quill and Quire, The Georgia Straight, Western Living and Canadian Business. Her work has brought her three Western Magazine Awards, including a Gold Award in 2003 for feature writing. In 2005 she won the Canadian National Magazine Awards' Silver award for Fiction. She has worked as a senior editor at Saturday Night and books editor for The Georgia Straight. Her 2011 collection of short stories Better Living Through Plastic Explosives was a shortlisted nominee for the 2011 Scotiabank Giller Prize.

She is also a writer of short stories, which have appeared in a number of publications. She published a collection of these stories, All the Anxious Girls on Earth in 1999. And her 2011 collection of short stories Better Living Through Plastic Explosives was a shortlisted nominee for the 2011 Scotiabank Giller Prize.

Gartner has been writer-in-residence at the University of British Columbia and a member of the faculty at Banff Centre's Writing Studios.

Gartner defended Mordecai Richler's novel Barney's Version on the CBC's Canada Reads 2004.

Her 2020 novel The Beguiling was shortlisted for the Rogers Writers' Trust Fiction Prize.

Bibliography
All the Anxious Girls on Earth (1999)
Darwin's Bastards (2009) – editor
Better Living Through Plastic Explosives (2011)
The Beguiling (2020)

References

External links
 Bio at Northwest Passages
 Author page at Random House

Year of birth missing (living people)
Living people
Canadian women journalists
Journalists from Alberta
Journalists from Manitoba
Writers from Calgary
Writers from Winnipeg
Carleton University alumni
University of Calgary alumni
University of British Columbia alumni
Canadian women non-fiction writers
Canadian women short story writers
20th-century Canadian short story writers
21st-century Canadian short story writers
21st-century Canadian women writers
20th-century Canadian women writers